The 2001 Israeli Labor Party leadership election was held by the Israeli Labor Party on 4 September 2001 to elect the leader of the party. In the initial count of the vote, Speaker of the Knesset Avraham Burg defeated Minister of Defense Binyamin Ben-Eliezer. Following alleged irregularities, the election was partially voided, with several precincts voting for a second time on 26 December. Following the redo, Ben-Eliezer was elected to lead the party, defeating Burg.

Background 
Incumbent party leader Ehud Barak announced that he was resigning as party leader after losing his premiership in the special 2001 Israeli prime ministerial election and facing opposition within the party.

Candidates 
Binyamin Ben-Eliezer, member of the Knesset since 1984, minister of Defense since 2001, former deputy prime minister (1999–2001), former minister of construction (1992–1996; 2000–2001), former minister of communications (1999–2001)
Avraham Burg, member of the Knesset since 1984, speaker of the Knesset since 2000, former acting president of Israel (2000)

Results

September 
In the September election, Burg defeated Ben-Eliezer by a margin of 1,088 votes.

December 
After the partial re-vote, the following tabulations were the election's final result:

References

Israeli Labor Party leadership elections
Labor Party leadership election
Israeli Labor Party
September 2001 events in Asia